Panpayak Sitchefboontham is a Muay Thai fighter.

Titles and accomplishments
Omnoi Stadium
 2015 Omnoi Stadium Shell Rimula Tournament Winner

World Boxing Council Muaythai
 2017 WBC Muay Thai World 135 lbs Champion
 2018 WBC Muay Thai Fighter of the Year
 2018 WBC Muay Thai Fight of the Year (February 26th vs. Saeksan Or. Kwanmuang)

Rajadamnern Stadium
 2019 Rajadamnern Stadium 140 lbs Champion

Fight record

|-  style="background:#FFBBBB;"
| 2023-01-01 || Loss ||align=left| Sakulchailek Pangkongpap || TorNamThai Kiatpetch TKO, Rajadamnern Stadium|| Bangkok, Thailand || KO (Elbow)|| 4 ||  
|-  style="background:#FFBBBB;"
| 2022-09-21 || Loss ||align=left| Kulabkhao Sor.Jor.Piek U-Thai  || Muay Thai Palangmai, Rajadamnern Stadium || Bangkok, Thailand || Decision  || 5 || 3:00
|-  style="background:#FFBBBB;"
| 2022-07-16 || Loss ||align=left| Prabsuek Siopol  || SuekJaoMuayThai, Omnoi Stadium || Bangkok, Thailand || Decision  || 5 || 3:00
|-  style="background:#FFBBBB;"
| 2022-06-18 || Loss ||align=left| Sakulchailek Pangkongpap ||Fairtex Fight Promotion, Lumpinee Stadium || Bangkok, Thailand || Decision (Unanimous) || 3 || 3:00
|-  style="background:#fbb;"
| 2022-03-20 ||Loss||align=left| Yod-ET Por.Tor.Thor.Thongthawee ||Chang Muaythai Kiatphet, Rajadamnern Stadium || Bangkok, Thailand || Decision ||  5||3:00
|-  style="background:#FFBBBB;"
| 2022-02-06 || Loss ||align=left| Yod-IQ Or.Phimonsri || Channel 7 Stadium|| Bangkok, Thailand || Decision || 5 || 3:00
|-  style="background:#FFBBBB;"
| 2021-12-26|| Loss ||align=left| Rambolek Sor.Tor.Watcharin || Channel 7 Stadium || Bangkok, Thailand || Decision || 5 || 3:00
|-  style="background:#FFBBBB;"
| 2020-10-26|| Loss ||align=left| Julio Lobo || Sitchefboontham, Rangsit Stadium || Rangsit, Thailand || KO (Elbows)||3 ||
|-  style="background:#FFBBBB;"
| 2020-01-22|| Loss ||align=left| Rangkhao Wor.Sangprapai || SuekBangrachan, Rajadamnern Stadium || Bangkok, Thailand || Decision || 5 || 3:00
|-  style="background:#FFBBBB;"
| 2019-12-23|| Loss ||align=left| Phet Utong Or. Kwanmuang || Sitchefboontham + Sor.Sommai, Rajadamnern Stadium || Bangkok, Thailand || Decision || 5 || 3:00
|-  style="background:#FFBBBB;"
| 2019-11-28|| Loss ||align=left| Panpayak Jitmuangnon || Sitchefboontham, Rajadamnern Stadium || Bangkok, Thailand || Decision || 5 || 3:00
|-  style="background:#CCFFCC;"
| 2019-08-22 || Win ||align=left| Chamuaktong Fightermuaythai || Sor.Sommai, Rajadamnern Stadium || Bangkok, Thailand || Decision  || 5 || 3:00
|-
! style=background:white colspan=9 |
|-  style="background:#FFBBBB;"
| 2019-06-27 || Loss ||align=left| Chamuaktong Fightermuaythai || Sitchefboontham, Rajadamnern Stadium || Bangkok, Thailand || Decision  || 5 || 3:00
|-  style="background:#CCFFCC;"
| 2019-05-16 || Win||align=left| Thaksinlek Kiatniwat || Muay Thai Rajadamnern + Chefboontham, Rajadamnern Stadium || Bangkok, Thailand || KO (Left Elbow) || 4 ||
|-  style="background:#CCFFCC;"
| 2019-03-07 || Win||align=left| Thaksinlek Kiatniwat || Muay Thai Rajadamnern + Jitmuangnon, Rajadamnern Stadium || Bangkok, Thailand || Decision || 5 || 3:00
|-  style="background:#FFBBBB;"
| 2019-02-07 || Loss||align=left| Phonek Or.Kwanmuang || Sitchefboontham, Rajadamnern Stadium || Bangkok, Thailand || Decision|| 5 || 3:00
|-  style="background:#FFBBBB;"
| 2018-12-21 || Loss ||align=left| Muangthai PKSaenchaimuaythaigym ||  Muay Thai Rajadamnern + Sor.Sommai, Rajadamnern Stadium || Bangkok, Thailand || Decision  || 5 ||
|-  style="background:#FFBBBB;"
| 2018-11-15|| Loss ||align=left| Saeksan Or. Kwanmuang ||Rajadamnern Stadium || Bangkok, Thailand || Decision || 5 || 3:00
|-
! style=background:white colspan=9 |
|-  style="background:#CCFFCC;"
| 2018-10-22|| Win ||align=left| Thaksinlek Kiatniwat ||Rajadamnern Stadium || Bangkok, Thailand || KO (Left Elbow)|| 3 ||
|-  style="background:#FFBBBB;"
| 2018-09-06|| Loss ||align=left| Nuenglanlek Jitmuangnon || Rajadamnern Stadium || Bangkok, Thailand || Decision || 5 || 3:00
|-  style="background:#CCFFCC;"
| 2018-07-14|| Win||align=left| Yodpanomrung Jitmuangnon || Rajadamnern Stadium || Bangkok, Thailand || Decision || 5 || 3:00
|-  style="background:#CCFFCC;"
| 2018-06-14|| Win||align=left| Yodpanomrung Jitmuangnon || Rajadamnern Stadium || Bangkok, Thailand || Decision || 5 || 3:00
|-  style="background:#FFBBBB;"
| 2018-03-22 || Loss||align=left| Saeksan Or. Kwanmuang ||Rajadamnern Stadium || Bangkok, Thailand || Decision || 5 || 3:00
|-  style="background:#CCFFCC;"
| 2018-02-26 || Win||align=left| Saeksan Or. Kwanmuang ||Rajadamnern Stadium || Bangkok, Thailand || Decision || 5 || 3:00
|-
! style=background:white colspan=9 |
|-  style="background:#FFBBBB;"
| 2017-12-21|| Loss||align=left| Saeksan Or. Kwanmuang ||Rajadamnern Stadium || Bangkok, Thailand || Decision || 5 || 3:00
|-
! style=background:white colspan=9 |
|-  style="background:#CCFFCC;"
| 2017-11-13|| Win||align=left| Extra Sitworaphat ||Rajadamnern Stadium || Bangkok, Thailand || Decision || 5 || 3:00
|-  style="background:#FFBBBB;"
| 2017-09-11|| Loss ||align=left| Yodlekpet Or. Pitisak || Rajadamnern Stadium || Bangkok, Thailand || KO || 3 ||
|-
! style=background:white colspan=9 |
|-  style="background:#CCFFCC;"
| 2017-05-25|| Win ||align=left| Phet Utong Or. Kwanmuang || Rajadamnern Stadium || Bangkok, Thailand || KO (Left Elbow)|| 3 ||
|-  style="background:#FFBBBB;"
| 2017-03-29|| Loss ||align=left| Yodlekpet Or. Pitisak || Rajadamnern Stadium || Bangkok, Thailand || Decision || 5 || 3:00
|-  style="background:#CCFFCC;"
| 2017-02-23 || Win||align=left| Phonek Or.Kwanmuang || Rajadamnern Stadium || Bangkok, Thailand || Decision|| 5 || 3:00 
|-
! style=background:white colspan=9 |
|-  style="background:#CCFFCC;"
| 2017-01-01 || Win||align=left| Phonek Or.Kwanmuang || Rajadamnern Stadium || Bangkok, Thailand || Decision|| 5 || 3:00
|-  style="background:#CCFFCC;"
| 2016-11-24 || Win||align=left| Yok Parunchai || Rajadamnern Stadium || Bangkok, Thailand || Decision|| 5 || 3:00
|-  style="background:#FFBBBB;"
| 2016-09-23|| Loss ||align=left|  Yodlekpet Or. Pitisak ||  Lumpinee Stadium || Bangkok, Thailand || KO (Left Knee to the Body)|| 3 ||
|-  style="background:#CCFFCC;"
| 2016-08-22 || Win ||align=left| Phonek Or.Kwanmuang || Rajadamnern Stadium || Bangkok, Thailand || Decision|| 5 || 3:00
|-  style="background:#FFBBBB;"
| 2016-07-18 || Loss||align=left| Yodlekpet Or. Pitisak || Rajadamnern Stadium || Bangkok, Thailand || KO (Right Hook)|| 4 ||
|-  style="background:#FFBBBB;"
| 2016-06-24 || Loss||align=left| Bangpleenoi Petchyindee Academy || Lumpinee Stadium || Bangkok, Thailand || Decision|| 5 || 3:00
|-  style="background:#FFBBBB;"
| 2016-03-10|| Loss ||align=left| Phet Utong Or. Kwanmuang || Rajadamnern Stadium || Bangkok, Thailand || Decision || 5 || 3:00
|-  style="background:#CCFFCC;"
| 2016-01-29|| Win||align=left| Phet Utong Or. Kwanmuang || Rajadamnern Stadium || Bangkok, Thailand || Decision || 5 || 3:00
|-  style="background:#FFBBBB;"
| 2015-12-23|| Loss||align=left| Thanonchai Thanakorngym || Rajadamnern Stadium || Bangkok, Thailand || Decision || 5 || 3:00
|-  style="background:#CCFFCC;"
| 2015-11-10|| Win ||align=left| Rodlek Jaotalaytong || Lumpinee Stadium || Bangkok, Thailand || Decision || 5 || 3:00
|-  style="background:#CCFFCC;"
| 2015-09-23|| Win ||align=left| Fasatan Sitwatcharachai  || Rajadamnern Stadium || Bangkok, Thailand || KO || 4 ||
|-  style="background:#CCFFCC;"
| 2015-07-15|| Win ||align=left| Phonek Or.Kwanmuang  || Rajadamnern Stadium || Bangkok, Thailand || Decision || 5 || 3:00
|-  style="background:#FFBBBB;"
| 2015-06-10|| Loss ||align=left| Phonek Or.Kwanmuang  || Rajadamnern Stadium || Bangkok, Thailand || Decision || 5 || 3:00
|-  style="background:#CCFFCC;"
| 2015-05-07|| Win ||align=left| Kongdanai Sor.Sommai  || Rajadamnern Stadium || Bangkok, Thailand || Decision || 5 || 3:00
|- style="background:#CCFFCC;"
| 2015-03-07 || Win||align=left| Kaonar P.K.SaenchaiMuaythaiGym || Siam Omnoi Stadium  || Samut Sakhon, Thailand || Decision || 5 || 3:00
|-
! style=background:white colspan=9 |
|- style="background:#CCFFCC;"
| 2015-01-17 || Win||align=left| Mongkolkaew Sor.Sommai || Siam Omnoi Stadium  || Samut Sakhon, Thailand || Decision || 5 || 3:00
|- style="background:#CCFFCC;"
| 2014-10-25 || Win||align=left| Intrachai Chor.Hapayak || Siam Omnoi Stadium  || Samut Sakhon, Thailand || KO || 3 ||
|- style="background:#CCFFCC;"
| 2014-09-20 || Win||align=left| Kaonar P.K.SaenchaiMuaythaiGym || Siam Omnoi Stadium  || Samut Sakhon, Thailand || KO || 3 || 
|-
| colspan=9 | Legend:

References

1995 births
Panpayak Sitchefboontham
Living people
Panpayak Sitchefboontham